New Mexico State Road 81 (NM 81) is a  state road in southwestern New Mexico. The route runs from the Mexico–U.S. border in Antelope Wells north to NM 9 in Hachita, passing through desert and semi-arid farmland. NM 81 is maintained by the New Mexico Department of Transportation (NMDOT).

Route description
NM 81 begins at the Mexico – U.S. border crossing in Antelope Wells, Hidalgo County; a local road links the crossing with Mexico Federal Highway 2 to the south. The border crossing in Antelope Wells is the least-trafficked crossing between Mexico and the U.S., and the only residents of Antelope Wells are U.S. Customs and Border Protection employees. North of Antelope Wells, the road passes through desert terrain, with a mountain range to the west. The road does not pass any communities or service stations between Antelope Wells and Hachita, and it has been described as "quiet" and "isolated"; according to NMDOT, 129 vehicles travel the road per day. Continuing north, the road enters a semi-arid farming region and passes another mountain range in the east. The road makes a turn to the north-northeast and crosses into Grant County before terminating at NM 9 in Hachita.

Major intersections

See also

 List of state roads in New Mexico

References

External links

081
Transportation in Hidalgo County, New Mexico
Transportation in Grant County, New Mexico